Preston Lodge High School is a six-year non-denominational school located in Prestonpans, Scotland. It serves students from Prestonpans, Port Seton, Longniddry and the surrounding areas.

Primary Schools

A student goes to Preston Lodge High School when they pass Primary School. The Primary Schools that contribute to Preston Lodge are Preston Tower Primary School, (Formerly Prestonpans Primary School,) St Gabriel's RC Primary School, Longniddry Primary School, and Cockenzie Primary School.

House system
Every pupil who goes to Preston Lodge High School is sorted into one of three houses. Everyone is sorted into a random house (unless they have an older sibling(s) already assigned to a house, in which case they are sorted into the same one):

  Gosford -  Which hosts the Gosford Estate.
  Seton -  Which hosts the Seton Fishing Harbour.
  Grange - Which hosts the Prestongrange Mines.

Notable events
The original school situated on Preston Road (the site of the current Preston Tower Primary School) burnt down in January 1967. A new school was built at Park View and formally opened on the 14th of November 1969 by the late John P Macintosh MA, D. The building was modernized in 2006.

Notable former pupils
Josh Taylor (boxer), Boxer

John Bellany, Painter

Jane Connachan, Golfer

Allan Jacobsen (rugby union), Rugby Player

Scott Murray (rugby union), Rugby Player

External links
 www.prestonlodge.net Official Website
 Preston Lodge High School's page on Scottish Schools Online
 Preston Lodge Achievers UK site

References

https://en.wikipedia.org/wiki/Category:Alumni_of_Preston_Lodge_High_School

Secondary schools in East Lothian
1924 establishments in Scotland
Educational institutions established in 1924
Prestonpans